The 2000–01 2. Bundesliga was the 27th season of the 2. Bundesliga, the second tier of the German football league system. 1. FC Nürnberg, Borussia Mönchengladbach and FC St. Pauli were promoted to the Bundesliga while VfL Osnabrück, SSV Ulm 1846, Stuttgarter Kickers and Chemnitzer FC were relegated to the Regionalliga.

League table
For the 2000–01 season LR Ahlen, SSV Reutlingen, 1. FC Saarbrücken and VfL Osnabrück were newly promoted to the 2. Bundesliga from the Regionalliga while SSV Ulm 1846, Arminia Bielefeld and MSV Duisburg had been relegated to the league from the Bundesliga.

Results

Top scorers
The league's top scorers:

References

External links
 Official Bundesliga site  
 2. Bundesliga @ DFB 
 kicker.de 

2. Bundesliga seasons
2
Germany